Ilya Silchukou, could also be spelled Ilya Silchukov, (born 1982) is a Belarusian Baryton-noble Baritone. He debuted his career in Tchaikovsky's Eugene Onegin at the National Opera and Ballet of Belarus in 2005.  Ever since his debut he has shared his appearance at several European opera houses. His academic and vocal achievements had shown his preparedness and the alertness of a true opera singer.

Early life and education 
Ilya Silchukov was born and grew up in Minsk, Belarus. In 1988, at the age of six he began studies of music and it became known that Ilya had an Absolute pitch.  In 2000, he graduated with honors from the State Musical Lyceum of the Belarusian State Academy of Music. As his base education he studied choir conducting. Starting from 9th grade, Silchukov began attending voice performance classes of baritone Sergey Kostin.  In 2002, he graduated from Minsk State Musical College n.a. M. Glinka classes of professor Adam Murzich majoring in Vocal Performance.  In 2005, Ilya Silchukov earned a BFA and in 2007 MD in Voice Performance at the Belarusian State Academy of Music under the tutelage of docents/associate professors Petr Riedeger and Larisa Shymanovitch.  In 2009, Silchukov participated in Tremplin Jeunes Chanteurs project of Opéra d'Avignon. In 2011, he was selected for Young Singers Program of the Salzburg Festival where he worked with Christa Ludwig, Piotr Beczała, Michael Schade, Simon Keenlyside, Marc Minkowski and Ivor Bolton.

Early career 
In 2005 Silchukov debuted his career in Eugene Onegin by Pyotr Ilyich Tchaikovsky entering the ensemble of the National Opera and Ballet of Belarus in Minsk.  Silchukov's International debut was in 2009 at Parnu International Opera Festival as Athanael in J. Massenett's "Thais" with Veronika Dzhioeva (Russia), Staged by Mai Murdmaa and directed by Erki Pehk. The next years brought performances in many important opera houses including Teatro dell'Opera di Roma, Oper Frankfurt, Israeli Opera, Théâtre Royal de la Monnaie, Grand Theatre, Warsaw, Teatro Lirico Giuseppe Verdi, Opéra National de Montpellier, Estonian National Opera, Slovak National Theater, Janáček Theatre, Vorarlberger Landestheater, Opera i Filharmonia Podlaska, Moldova National Opera Ballet, National Theatre Brno, Perm Opera and Ballet Theatre, Bruckner Festival, and others.

Professional career
In 2019 Ilya Silchukou performed a duet with Elena Salo at the Opening Ceremony of 2nd 2019 European Games hold in Minsk, Belarus: Among Anna Netrebko, Yusif Eyvazov, Igor Krutoy and Dimash Kudaibergen.   In 2008, 2009 and 2010 Ilya Silchukou was awarded grand prizes of the Special Fund of the President of the Republic of Belarus for Support of the Talented Youth.

Silchukou's public opposition to Alexander Lukashenko's re-election as President of Belarus in August 2020 resulted in his being fired from the National Opera in Minsk. Subsequently, in May 2021, Silchukou left Belarus with his family and settled in Boston USA. He has renounced three Special Fund of the President of the Republic of Belarus awards that he received personally from Lukashenko in 2008,2009 and 2010.

Awards and achievements 
 In 2015 Silchukov was given a, governed by the Law of the Republic of Belarus, State award – Medal Of Francysk Skaryna for contribution to the development of national culture and art.
 In 2015 Silchukov received the International Music Award BelBrand

Roles and productions

Competitions
In 2001 Ilya Silchukov won his first vocal contest by getting 1st Prize of 2nd National S. Maniuszko Vocal Competition in Cherven, Belarus.  Following his success Ilya went on to compete at numerous vocal competitions around the world.  Among most honored competitions attended are: Belvedere Competition, Klaudia Taev Competition, Muslim Magomaev Competition...

Discography 
 RACHMANINOV, S.: Troika- Aleko / The Miserly Knight / Francesca da Rimini (rec. La Monnaie, 06/2015; Label: Bel Air Classiques; Catalogue No: BAC133; Barcode: 3760115301337; Physical Release: 08/2016)

Photos

References

External links

 
 Ilya Silchukov at Crescendi Artists

Living people
1982 births
Musicians from Minsk
21st-century Belarusian male singers
Operatic baritones
21st-century male opera singers
Belarusian opera singers